Zakariyya' al-Qazwini, also known as Qazvini, born  in Qazvin (Iran) and died 1283, was a Persian cosmographer and geographer of Arab ancestry.

He belonged to a family of jurists originally descended from Anas bin Malik (a companion of the Islamic prophet Muhammad) which had been well established in Qazvin long before al-Qazwini was born.

He is also the author of the geographical dictionary  (lit. 'Monuments of the Lands and Historical Traditions about Their Peoples').

Career

Born in Qazvin, Iran, al-Qazwini served as a legal expert and judge in several localities in Iran. He traveled around in Mesopotamia and the Levant, and finally entered the circle patronized by the Ilkhanid governor of Baghdad, Ata-Malik Juvayni (d. 1283 CE).

It was to the latter that al-Qazwini dedicated his famous cosmography titled . This treatise, frequently illustrated, was immensely popular and is preserved today in many copies. It was translated into his native Persian language, and later also into Turkish. Al-Qazwini was also well known for his geographical dictionary  (lit. 'Monuments of the Lands and Historical Traditions about Their Peoples'). Both of these treatises reflect extensive reading and learning in a wide range of disciplines.

See also
List of Persian scientists and scholars
List of pre-modern Arab scientists and scholars

References

Bibliography

Encyclopedic sources

Secondary literature

Editions of the Arabic text

 (edition of the )
 (edition of the )

Translations

 (German translation of the )
 (partial German translation of the )

Further reading
 Zadeh, Travis (2023). Wonders and Rarities: The Marvelous Book That Traveled the World and Mapped the Cosmos. Harvard University Press. ISBN 0674258452.

External links 

 Islamic Medical Manuscripts at the National Library of Medicine. U.S. National Library of Medicine, Bethesda, MD.
 Kitāb al-ʻajāʾib wa al-gharāʼib. Full online version from the Getty Library.

1203 births
1283 deaths
13th-century Iranian scientists
Iranian people of Arab descent
13th-century Iranian astronomers
Medieval Iranian geographers
13th-century Iranian physicians
People from Qazvin
Zoologists of the medieval Islamic world
Scholars of the Ilkhanate